XHNB-FM is a radio station on 95.3 FM in San Luis Potosí, San Luis Potosí. It is owned by Grupo ACIR and carries its Amor romantic format.

History
XHNB received its concession on January 11, 1979. It was owned by Carlos de la Peña y Quintero but has always been part of ACIR.

References

Radio stations in San Luis Potosí
Grupo ACIR